OGLE-TR-56b is an extrasolar planet located approximately 1500 parsecs or 5000 light years away in the constellation of Sagittarius, orbiting the star OGLE-TR-56. This planet was the first known exoplanet to be discovered with the transit method. The object was discovered by the OGLE project, announced on July 5, 2002 and confirmed on January 4, 2003 by the Doppler technique.
The period of this confirmed planet was the shortest until the confirmed discovery of WASP-12b on April 1, 2008. 
The short period and proximity of the OGLE-TR-56 b to its host mean it belongs to a class of objects known as hot Jupiters.

The planet is thought to be only 4 stellar radii from its star, and hot enough to have iron rain.

See also 
 Optical Gravitational Lensing Experiment (OGLE)
 OGLE-TR-113b
 OGLE-TR-10b
 OGLE-TR-111b
 OGLE2-TR-L9b

References

External links 

 

Hot Jupiters
Sagittarius (constellation)
Transiting exoplanets
Exoplanets discovered in 2002
Giant planets

de:OGLE-TR-56 b